Étrabonne is a commune in the Doubs department in the Bourgogne-Franche-Comté region in eastern France.

Geography

Bordering municipalities

Town planning

Typology 
Étrabonne is a rural municipality, because it is part of the municipalities with little or very little density, within the meaning of the municipal density grid of INSEE.

In addition, the municipality is part of the attraction area of Besançon, of which it is a municipality in the crown. This area, which includes 312 municipalities, is categorized in areas of 200,000 to less than 700,000 inhabitants.

Land use 
The zoning of the municipality, as reflected in the database European occupation biophysical soil Corine Land Cover (CLC), is marked by the importance of the agricultural land (73.5% in 2018), a proportion identical to that of 1990 (73.5%). The detailed breakdown in 2018 is as follows: 

 arable land (44.3%)
 forests (26.5%)
 meadows (20%)
 heterogeneous agricultural areas (9.2%)

The IGN also provides an online tool to compare the evolution over time of land use in the municipality (or in territories at different scales). Several eras are accessible as aerial maps or photos: the Cassini map (18th century), the map of Staff (1820-1866) and the current period (1950 to present).

Toponymy 
The place was designated as Strabunne in 1166; Strabona in 1223; Estrabeigne in 1266 and Estrabonne in 1307.

Policy and Administration

Administrative and electoral attachments 
The town is located in the district of Besançon in the department of Doubs. For the election of deputies, it has been part of the first district of Doubs since 1986.

Since 1801, it was part of the canton of Audeux. As part of the 2014 cantonal redistribution in France, the town is now attached to the canton of Saint-Vit.

Intercommunality 
The municipality was a member of the small community of municipalities of the Val Saint-Vitois, created at the end of 2001.

Within the framework of the provisions of the law on the new territorial organization of the Republic (NOTRe Law) of August 7, 2015, which provides that public inter-municipal cooperation establishments (EPCI) with their own taxation must have a minimum of 15,000 inhabitants (and 5,000 inhabitants in mountain areas), the prefecture of Doubs has adopted the new departmental inter-municipal cooperation plan (SDCI) which provides in particular for the break-up of this community of communes and the attachment of some of its communes to the community of communes of Val-de-Marne, others to Grand Besançon Métropole, and two, finally, to the community of communes of Loue-Lison.

Places and monuments 

 House of Bailly.

 Étrabonne Castle, from medieval times, listed as a historical monument in 1968.
 Saint-Martin Church.

Population

See also
 Communes of the Doubs department

References

Communes of Doubs